Calosoma argentinensis is a species of ground beetle in the subfamily of Carabinae. It was described by Csiki in 1927.

References

argentinensis
Beetles described in 1927